Douglas Wayne Davalos (born February 10, 1970) is a former Texas State University basketball coach. Davalos had a record of 92-107 during his seven seasons with the Bobcats. 

Davalos is the son of former college athletic director Rudy Davalos. 

Douglas Wayne Davalos was the head girls basketball coach at Westwood Round Rock high school for a few years. He is no longer head coach as of 2/15/2023.

References

1970 births
Living people
American men's basketball coaches
High school basketball coaches in Texas
Texas State Bobcats men's basketball coaches
Place of birth missing (living people)